Amel Majri (born 25 January 1993) is a French-Tunisian professional footballer, who plays in the French First Division for Olympique Lyon, with whom she has also played the Champions League with, and won. She is naturally a midfielder, but has been playing as a left-back for Lyon in recent seasons. She also plays for the France national team.

Early life
Majri was born in Monastir, Tunisia and moved to France at the age of 1 alongside her twin sister, Rachida, and her mother, Hafsia. They settled in Vénissieux in the residential area of Minguettes, located in the suburbs of Lyon. She returns to Tunisia every summer.

She began playing football in Tunisia at the age of 4 with her uncle. She perfected her technique using tennis balls and spent her summers on the beaches of Tunisia playing beach football. In France, she played five-a-side pick up games with boys in her neighbourhood until the age of 12, and at school. Upon seeing her play in the schoolyard, her primary school teacher insisted that she join a club, something Majri was initially against. Eventually, she joined l'AS Minguettes where she was the only girl on her team. Two years later, she was recruited by Olympique Lyonnais aged 14.

Personal life
Majri is a Muslim. She became married in 2012.

Career statistics

Club

International

Scores and results list France's goal tally first, score column indicates score after each Majri goal.

Honours
Lyon
Division 1 Féminine: 2010–11, 2011–12, 2012–13, 2013–14, 2014–15, 2015–16, 2016–17, 2017–18, 2018–19, 2019–20
Coupe de France Féminine: 2011–12, 2012–13, 2013–14, 2014–15, 2015–16, 2016–17, 2018–19, 2019–20
UEFA Women's Champions League: 2010–11, 2011–12, 2015–16, 2016–17, 2017–18, 2018–19, 2019–20

France
SheBelieves Cup: 2017
Tournoi de France: 2020

Individual
 UNFP Female Player of the Year: 2015–16

References

External links 
 
 
 
 

1993 births
Living people
Tunisian women's footballers
Expatriate women's footballers in France
People from Monastir Governorate
Naturalized citizens of France
Tunisian emigrants to France
France women's youth international footballers
France women's international footballers
Olympique Lyonnais Féminin players
Women's association football midfielders
Women's association football fullbacks
2015 FIFA Women's World Cup players
Footballers at the 2016 Summer Olympics
Olympic footballers of France
French women's footballers
Division 1 Féminine players
2019 FIFA Women's World Cup players